The following is a list of 1978 Seattle Mariners draft picks. The list includes the June regular draft (Rule 4 draft), the June secondary draft, and the January regular draft, and January secondary draft. In all of the drafts, the Mariners made 34 selections, including 12 pitchers, 6 catchers, 5 outfielders, 3 utility players, 3 shortstops, 2 first basemen, 1 infielder, 1 third baseman, and 1 second baseman. Six players drafted by the Mariners in 1978 went on to play in Major League Baseball.

Drafts

Key

June regular draft

June secondary draft

January regular draft

January secondary draft

See also
List of Seattle Mariners first-round draft picks

References
General references

Inline citations

External links
Seattle Mariners official website